Karen Elizabeth Tilley was Miss Canada in 1985, who also placed in the top 10 at the 1985 Miss Universe pageant.

Life
Tilley was born in Quebec City, Quebec and later moved to Calgary, Alberta and represented this province in the Miss Canada competition. Tilley's hobbies include cooking, travelling, dancing and hiking. When she won the national competition she earned $76,937.80 (Canadian Dollars) in cash and prizes, including $12,000 car, a $6,000 fur coat and $1,500 scholarship.

In the year following her win as Miss Canada, Tilley was based in Toronto where she participated in promotional events for sponsors, had her presence was paid for by companies on a 'per-appearance basis', and traveled to different places in Canada. She described her appearances as public relations, which was a career she intended to follow after her year as Miss Canada.

Tilley represented Canada in the 1985 Miss Universe competition and was one of ten semifinalists when Deborah Carthy-Deu was crowned as Miss Universe.

References

1964 births
Anglophone Quebec people
Canadian female models
Living people
Miss Canada winners
Miss Universe 1985 contestants
People from Quebec City